Edwin Bennett Astwood (December 19, 1909 – February 17, 1976) was a Bermudian-American physiologist and endocrinologist, his research on endocrine system led to treatments for hyperthyroidism. He was elected a Fellow of the American Academy of Arts and Sciences in 1949. In 1948, he was awarded the Cameron Prize for Therapeutics of the University of Edinburgh. He died of cancer on February 17, 1976, in Hamilton, Bermuda.

References

Cooper, D. Y. Astwood, Edwin Bennett. American National Biography Online Feb. 2000.

External links
National Academy of Sciences Biographical Memoir

1909 births
1976 deaths
American physiologists
American endocrinologists
Recipients of the Albert Lasker Award for Basic Medical Research
Fellows of the American Academy of Arts and Sciences
20th-century American physicians
Deaths from cancer in Bermuda
Bermudian emigrants to the United States